George G. Taylor was a professional rugby league footballer who played in the 1900s, 1910s and 1920s. He played at club level for Wakefield Trinity (Heritage № 170), as a forward (prior to the specialist positions of), during the era of contested scrums.

Playing career
George Taylor made his début for Wakefield Trinity during September 1907, he appears to have scored no drop-goals (or field-goals as they are currently known in Australasia), but prior to the 1974–75 season all goals, whether; conversions, penalties, or drop-goals, scored 2-points, consequently prior to this date drop-goals were often not explicitly documented, therefore '0' drop-goals may indicate drop-goals not recorded, rather than no drop-goals scored. In addition, prior to the 1949–50 season, the archaic field-goal was also still a valid means of scoring points.

County Cup Final appearances
George Taylor played as a forward, i.e. number 12, in Wakefield Trinity's 8-2 victory over Huddersfield in the 1910 Yorkshire County Cup Final during the 1910–11 season at Headingley Rugby Stadium, Leeds on Saturday 3 December 1910.

Notable tour matches
George Taylor played as a forward, i.e. number 9, in Wakefield Trinity's 20-13 victory over Australia in the 1908–09 Kangaroo tour of Great Britain match at Belle Vue, Wakefield on Saturday 19 December 1908.

Testimonial match
George Taylor's Testimonial match for Wakefield Trinity took place against Batley at Belle Vue, Wakefield on Saturday 12 February 1921, it was a joint Testimonial match with Herbert Kershaw.

References

External links

Search for "Taylor" at rugbyleagueproject.org

Year of birth missing
Year of death missing
Place of birth missing
Place of death missing
Rugby league forwards
Wakefield Trinity players
English rugby league players